Lego minifigures may refer to:
 Lego minifigure, a Lego toy person
 Lego Minifigures (theme), a 2010 Lego theme
 Lego Minifigures Online, an upcoming massively multiplayer online game